C. J. "Keith" van Rijsbergen FREng (Cornelis Joost van Rijsbergen; born 1943) is a professor of computer science at the University of Glasgow, where he founded the Glasgow Information Retrieval Group. He is one of the founders of modern Information Retrieval and the author of the seminal monograph Information Retrieval and of the textbook The Geometry of Information Retrieval.

He was born in Rotterdam, and educated in the Netherlands, Indonesia, Namibia and Australia.
His first degree is in mathematics from the University of Western Australia, and in 1972 he completed a
PhD in computer science at the University of Cambridge.
He spent three years lecturing in information retrieval and artificial intelligence at Monash University
before returning to Cambridge to hold a Royal Society Information Research Fellowship. 
In 1980 he was appointed to the chair of computer science at University College Dublin;
from there he moved in 1986 to Glasgow University. He chaired the Scientific Board of the Information Retrieval Facility from 2007 to 2012.

Awards and honors
In 2003 he was inducted as a Fellow of the Association for Computing Machinery. In 2004 he was awarded the Tony Kent Strix award.
In 2004 he was appointed a Fellow of the Royal Academy of Engineering.
In 2006, he was awarded the Gerard Salton Award for Quantum haystacks.

See also
F1 score

References

External links
C. J. "Keith" van Rijsbergen - The University of Glasgow
Glasgow Information Retrieval Group
Information Retrieval book - C. J. van Rijsbergen 1979
Information Retrieval Facility

 Interviewed by Alan Macfarlane 15 July 2009 (video)

1943 births
Living people
Dutch computer scientists
Fellows of the Association for Computing Machinery
Scientists from Rotterdam
University of Western Australia alumni
Information retrieval researchers